Orem Community Hospital (OCH) is located Orem, Utah, United States and is part of the Intermountain Healthcare system.

Description
OCH specializes in outpatient services including obstetrics and same day surgery. Its relationship with Utah Valley Hospital means OCH has the backup and support of a larger hospital, while at the same time maintaining the personalized care expected from a community hospital.

OCH features 24 LDRP rooms, where mothers labor, deliver, recover and spend their postpartum stay all in the same room. This is a unique birthing option in Utah County. In 2008, 1,426 babies were delivered at the hospital.

History
OCH opened in 1981 as a maternity hospital, and after five years and a  expansion OCH became a full-service hospital, with an emergency room, Women's Center, medical surgical, laboratory, x-ray and health education services.

In 1995, the Central Orem Health Center addition was completed along with a WorkMed unit and the Utah Valley Pediatric Rehabilitation Center. A beautification of the campus began with the addition of a jogging path around the campus and soccer fields in conjunction with Orem City.

Hospital quality
The Hospital earned three out of five stars for OB-GYN service, according to the Healthgrades website.

References

External links

Hospital buildings completed in 1981
Hospitals in Utah County, Utah
Intermountain Health
Buildings and structures in Orem, Utah
Hospitals established in 1981